Herbert Hodgkinson (26 December 1903 – 1974) was a professional footballer who played for Penistone Juniors, Barnsley, Tottenham Hotspur, Colwyn Bay and Crewe Alexandra.

Football career 
Hodgkinson began his playing career with his local youth team Penistone Juniors. In 1923 the left back joined Barnsley where he featured in 200 matches between 1923–29. He signed for Tottenham Hotspur in 1930 to go on and make a further 58 appearances in all competitions. After leaving White Hart Lane Hodgkinson played for Colwyn Bay United before joining Crewe Alexandra where he ended his football career.

References 

1903 births
1974 deaths
People from Penistone
English footballers
English Football League players
Barnsley F.C. players
Tottenham Hotspur F.C. players
Colwyn Bay F.C. players
Crewe Alexandra F.C. players
Footballers from Yorkshire
Association football central defenders